Leonardo Augusto Gomes Aro (born December 14, 1983 in Jundiaí, Brazil), known as Leo Aro, is a Brazilian striker, currently playing for Atlético Clube Bragantino.

Honours
Brazilian Cup: 2005
FIFA Club World Cup Championship: 2006
Paraná State Championship:2008

Contract
 Figueirense (Loan) 1 March 2007 to 31 December 2007
 Internaconal 1 January 2006 to 31 December 2009

1983 births
Brazilian footballers
Living people
Botafogo de Futebol e Regatas players
Guarani FC players
Sport Club Internacional players
Paulista Futebol Clube players
Esporte Clube Juventude players
Figueirense FC players
U.S. Lecce players
Leixões S.C. players
Serie A players
Primeira Liga players
Expatriate footballers in Italy
Expatriate footballers in Portugal
Clube Atlético Bragantino players
Association football forwards
People from Jundiaí
Footballers from São Paulo (state)